Matt Hossack (born February 02, 1994) is a Canadian professional box lacrosse player who currently plays with the Panther City Lacrosse Club of the National Lacrosse League.

College career
Hossack attended the Rochester Institute of Technology, where he was named the Liberty League Defensive Player of the Year for two straight seasons with the RIT Tigers. At RIT he finished 5th all time in ground balls with 369 ground balls, as well as second all time in caused turnovers with 139.

Professional career
Hossack was drafted 14th overall by the Saskatchewan Rush in 2016. He went on to win one NLL Championship in the 2018 NLL Cup Finals with the Rush. He was drafted in the 2020 NLL expansion draft by the Panther City Lacrosse Club.

Hossack has played for the Brooklin Lacrosse Club of the Major Series Lacrosse and has won a Minto Cup with the Whitby Warriors Junior A lacrosse club.

NLL stats

Source:

Awards and honours
Minto Cup, 2013 (with the Brooklin Lacrosse Club)
2015 Liberty League Defensive Player of the Year
2016 Liberty League Defensive Player of the Year
NLL Cup, 2018 (with the Saskatchewan Rush)

References

External links 
Matt Hossack at NLL.com
 RIT Tigers bio

1994 births
Living people
Saskatchewan Rush players
Canadian lacrosse players
Lacrosse transitions
National Lacrosse League All-Stars
National Lacrosse League major award winners
Panther City LC players